"Don't Give Up on Us" is a song by American-British singer David Soul. Riding high on the success of his role in the hit TV show Starsky and Hutch, Soul returned to singing, which had been one of his early career choices. His debut, the Tony Macaulay-written-and-produced "Don't Give Up on Us" was a worldwide smash, spending four weeks at No. 1 on the UK Singles Chart in January and February 1977, and a single week at No. 1 on the Billboard Hot 100 in April 1977. In addition, the song spent one week at No. 1 on the U.S. Adult Contemporary chart.  It has sold 1.16 million copies in the UK.

Its B-side, "Black Bean Soup", with lyrics by actor Gardner McKay, is a duet with actress Lynne Marta, whom Soul was involved with at the time.

"Don't Give Up on Us" was rated No. 93 in VH1's 100 Greatest One-Hit Wonders because, despite having more hits in the UK, Soul was never again able to reach the top 40 in the US.  Soul recorded a new version of the song in 2004, allegedly after being embarrassed when hearing it by chance in an elevator as sung by Owen Wilson in the film version of Starsky and Hutch. The film soundtrack included a cover of the song by Wilson and Neal Casal.

Chart performance

Weekly charts

Year-end charts

Decade-end charts

Cover versions
Irish singer Darren Holden covered "Don't Give Up on Us" in 1997, reaching No. 23 in Ireland.

The song is popular in the Philippines and has been covered by Zsa Zsa Padilla, Kuh Ledesma, Jimmy Bondoc, Marion Aunor, JM de Guzman and Piolo Pascual for the soundtrack of the 2006 film of the same title.

In popular culture
Owen Wilson (playing Hutch, originally Soul's character) sang the song during a scene in the film version of Starsky and Hutch. The song was also used in the film Johnny English Reborn (2011).

See also
 List of 1970s one-hit wonders in the United States

References

External links
 
 

1976 songs
1976 singles
1997 singles
David Soul songs
Songs written by Tony Macaulay
Private Stock Records singles
UK Singles Chart number-one singles
Billboard Hot 100 number-one singles
Cashbox number-one singles
Number-one singles in Australia
RPM Top Singles number-one singles
Irish Singles Chart number-one singles
Number-one singles in New Zealand
British soft rock songs
Pop ballads